Membrane progesterone receptor epsilon (mPRɛ), or progestin and adipoQ receptor 9 (PAQR9), is a protein that in humans is encoded by the PAQR9 gene.

See also
 Membrane progesterone receptor
 Progestin and adipoQ receptor

References

Further reading

 

7TM receptors